The 2019 Women's EuroHockey Club Trophy was the 43rd edition of the women's Women's EuroHockey Club Trophy, Europe's secondary club field hockey tournament organized by the EHF. It was held from 19 to 22 April 2019 in Rochester, England.

Campo de Madrid won the tournament after defeating Holcombe 3–1 in the final. Waterloo Ducks finished third, after defeating UCD 2–0 in the third place playoff.

Teams

 Victorya Smolevichi
 Waterloo Ducks
 Holcombe
 UCD
 Moscomsport
 Edinburgh
 Club de Campo
 Sumchanka

Results

Preliminary round

Pool A

Pool B

Classification round

Seventh and eighth place

Fifth and sixth place

Third and fourth place

Final

Statistics

Awards

Final standings

References

Club Trophy Women
EuroHockey Club Trophy
International women's field hockey competitions hosted by England
Rochester, Kent
Women's EuroHockey Club Trophy
EuroHockey Club Trophy
EuroHockey Club Trophy